The Edgeworth David Medal is awarded annually by the Royal Society of New South Wales for distinguished contributions by a young scientist under the age of 35 years for work done predominantly in Australia or which contributed to the advancement of Australian science.

It was first awarded in 1949 and is named after the pioneering geologist Sir Edgeworth David, FRS.

Recipients
Source: RSNSW

See also 

 List of general science and technology awards 
 List of awards named after people

References

Early career awards
Australian science and technology awards
Awards established in 1943